Vladimir Fedin is a Russian Paralympic judoka. He represented Russia at the 2012 Summer Paralympics held in London, United Kingdom and he won one of the bronze medals in the men's 100 kg event.

References

External links 
 

Living people
Year of birth missing (living people)
Place of birth missing (living people)
Russian male judoka
Judoka at the 2012 Summer Paralympics
Medalists at the 2012 Summer Paralympics
Paralympic bronze medalists for Russia
Paralympic medalists in judo
Paralympic judoka of Russia
21st-century Russian people